Gregory Lenard Lloyd Sr. (born May 26, 1965) is an American former professional football player who was an outside linebacker in the National Football League (NFL), primarily with the Pittsburgh Steelers. He was named to five Pro Bowls and three All-Pro teams.

College career
Lloyd attended Fort Valley State University, where he was a three time All-Southern Intercollegiate Athletic Conference (SIAC) selection, a three time team Defensive MVP, and as a senior, he was the SIAC Player of the Year, and a first-team Sheridan All-American selection.  He was also a member of Kappa Alpha Psi fraternity.

Professional career
Lloyd did not receive an invitation to the NFL Scouting Combine, but did play in the Heritage Bowl. Pittsburgh Steelers' scouts viewed a videotape of the Lloyd in the historically black college All-Star Game and were impressed by his ability to play sideline-to-sideline as he exhibited a bit of a mean streak. Steelers' scout, Tom Donahoe, flew to Atlanta and drove  hours to Fort Valley State to work out Lloyd and was further impressed. The Pittsburgh Steelers selected Lloyd in the sixth round (150th overall) of the 1987 NFL Draft. Lloyd was the 28th linebacker drafted in 1987.

On July 28, 1987, it was reported that Lloyd had suffered a sprained left knee in training camp. Lloyd's knee injury sidelined him for his entire rookie season in 1987 and most of the 1988 season. He became a starter during the 1989 season at outside linebacker where he excelled. He became the emotional and fiery leader of the Steelers defense after the retirement of inside linebacker David Little. Lloyd teamed with cornerback Rod Woodson to give the Steelers two of the most dynamic and dominating defensive players in the game. Both Lloyd and Woodson were drafted in 1987 by then Steelers coach Chuck Noll.

Later career
Lloyd remained the starter through the 1997 season, missing almost the entire 1996 season with a knee injury and several games in 1997 due to a staph infection. He was named to five Pro Bowls and three NFL All-Pro teams during this time. Lloyd left the Steelers in 1998 and played for the Carolina Panthers before retiring. A true leader and student of the game, Lloyd continued to impact the Steelers defense while injured from the sideline by teaching young linebackers Chad Brown and Jason Gildon the finer points of Steelers linebacking tradition.

In 2020, the Steelers inducted him into their Hall of Honor.

Personal life
Lloyd was born in Miami, Florida, and was raised by his mother there until the age of two. In 1967, Lloyd's mother drove him and five of his eight siblings to Fort Valley, Georgia, and left them with his Aunt Bertha Mae. He has never met his father and was raised in a two bedroom apartment along with nine other children. Lloyd grew up in poverty and had two outfits to wear throughout the week. He began playing football at the age of six and played fullback and linebacker in high school.

Lloyd has a black belt in Tae Kwon Do, which he currently teaches. He is also well known for using an expletive in a nationally televised interview with NBC's Jim Gray after Pittsburgh defeated the Indianapolis Colts in the 1995 AFC Championship.

Lloyd's son Greg Lloyd Jr. was a linebacker for the University of Connecticut football team, and he wears #95 like his father.

References

1965 births
Living people
American football linebackers
American male taekwondo practitioners
Carolina Panthers players
Fort Valley State Wildcats football players
Pittsburgh Steelers players
American Conference Pro Bowl players
Sportspeople from Miami
Players of American football from Miami
People from Fort Valley, Georgia
Players of American football from Georgia (U.S. state)
African-American players of American football
21st-century African-American people
20th-century African-American sportspeople
Ed Block Courage Award recipients